Crystal Fountains Inc., known as Crystal, is a water feature design and product manufacturing firm based in Toronto, Ontario, Canada. Founded in 1967, Crystal has completed thousands of projects worldwide, spread over 6 continents in over 30 countries.  The company is best known for its work on the Crown Fountain  in Millennium Park, Chicago, Illinois and the water feature at Washington Harbour  in Georgetown, just outside Washington D.C.

History 
Crystal was founded in 1967 by Roger L'Heureux, an engineer at a Toronto-based drain company, when he collaborated on fountains for the Expo 67 pavilions in Montreal with international sculptor Gerald Gladstone. Through the late 1960s and 1970s, L'Heureux continued to design and install water features throughout the Toronto area, often in conjunction with Gladstone. One of Crystal's best known projects of this era was the design and implementation of the principal water feature in Toronto's Eaton Centre. Opened in 1977, and still operating today, the fountain shoots a column of water  into the air every 10 minutes before catching it in a comparatively small basin 6 meters in diameter.

In 1977, Crystal acquired Decorative Fountain Company (or DEFO),  a producer of fountain components such as nozzles and drains. With its new manufacturing capabilities, Crystal continued to expand through the late 1970s and 1980s. During this time, Crystal specialized in fountains for malls and other indoor spaces, focusing on selling water feature components and design services to predominately Canadian customers.

L'Heureux retired in 1987 and passed the business down to his two sons, Paul and David L'Heureux, as Crystal continued to move away from fountain installation and focus more heavily on design services and product supply. This design focus also ushered in a decade of international expansion,  as Crystal began exporting its products and undertaking projects in foreign markets in the early 1990s.

In the 2000s, Crystal continued to expand internationally by opening a Dubai office in 2007, and completing notable projects such as Crown Fountain, the main water feature at Al Kout Mall  in Fahaheel, Kuwait, and the lotus-inspired fountain in Moscow's White Square, Crystal's first foray into Russia.

As of 2011, Crystal Fountains Inc. officially rebranded itself as Crystal to better reflect the comprehensive nature of its water feature work. The company continues to operate as a fountain product manufacturer and supplier while designing a number of significant projects each year. Projects from this period include the World Voices fountain in the residential lobby of the world's tallest building, Burj Khalifa and the Aquatheatre aboard Royal Caribbean's Oasis of the Seas cruise ship. For the World Voices feature, Crystal collaborated with international artist Jaume Plensa  (who had previously worked with Crystal on Crown Fountain ) to create a water feature that doubled as a work of art. The Aquatheatre, meanwhile, had to be incorporated into all the other systems aboard the Oasis Of the Seas, resulting in the first-ever theatrical water feature installed on a cruise ship.

Crystal's one of the essential work was the central water feature for the redevelopment of Washington Harbour  in Georgetown. While the historical tower in the middle of the plaza remains in its original form, the rest of the fountain has been renovated with new lights, nozzles, and show capabilities. The water feature also converts into a 12,000 sq ft. ice rink  in the winter months, making the Harbour a popular destination year round.

One of the masterpiece projects of Crystal was the water attraction that is part of a new turning basin extension project of the Woodlands Development Group. Being the Woodlands community’s biggest attraction, a 1.7-mile-long waterway flows through the heart of the development project. Crystal has contributed to illuminate the broad turning basin which is located on one end of the Woodlands Waterway with their latest Spectra Linear RGBACL technology. As the latest innovation in the LED lighting industry which produces a range of color from purest white to broadest color spectrum, Crystal’s designers exceeded the client’s expectations and programmed the feature with specific shades such as 4th of July red, white and blue and the breast cancer awareness month pink.

Revitalization at Longwood Gardens was another key project of Crystal featuring RGBACL LED technology. In order to preserve the historical significance and carry the fountain to modern 21st century simultaneously, Crystal provided LEDs with the capability to color match specific significant shades and tones, along with an infinite array of pantone colors to illuminate the water and surrounding landscape.

Noteworthy projects 
Crystal has been a part of the following significant projects in a design or product supply capacity:
 Crown Fountain,  Chicago, Illinois
 Washington Harbour  Fountain, Georgetown, Washington D.C.
 Grand Park Fountain, Los Angeles, California
 Sugar Beach  Fountain, Toronto, Ontario
 White Square Fountain, Moscow, Russia
 World Voices Fountain,  Dubai, United Arab Emirates
 Woodlands Turning Basin, The Woodlands, Texas
 Royal Palace of Venaria Fountain, Turin, Italy
 Zlote Tarasy  Fountain, Warsaw, Poland
 Yas Island  Welcome Pavilion Fountain, Abu Dhabi, U.A.E.
 Oasis Of The Seas Aquatheatre,  Royal Caribbean International
 Canada's Wonderland Royal Fountain,  Toronto, Ontario
 Washington Park  Fountain, Cincinnati, Ohio
 Place des Spectacles  Water Feature, Montreal, Quebec
 Dragon Water Feature  at Taipei 101, Taipei, Taiwan
Palace of Versailles Neptune and Latona Fountains, Versailles, France 
Longwood Gardens Water Feature, Kenneth Square, Pennsylvania,

References 

Companies based in Toronto
Architecture firms of Canada
1967 establishments in Ontario